The Veiled Christ (Italian: Cristo velato) is a 1753 marble sculpture by Giuseppe Sanmartino exhibited in the Cappella Sansevero, Naples, Italy.

Veiled Christ is considered one of the world's most remarkable sculptures, and legendarily thought to have been created by alchemy. Sculptor Antonio Canova, who tried to acquire the work, declared that he would willingly give up ten years of his life to produce a similar masterpiece.

History and description 

Veiled Christs production was originally assigned to the sculptor Antonio Corradini, who specialized in veiled statues.  However, Corradini died a short time later, having produced only a terracotta bozzetto (today displayed at the Museo Nazionale di San Martino). The job thus passed to Giuseppe Sanmartino, who was charged with producing "a marble statue sculpted with the greatest realism, representing Our Lord Jesus Christ in death, covered by a transparent shroud carved from the same block of stone as the statue."

Sanmartino produced a work with the dead Christ laid on a couch, covered by a veil which adheres perfectly to his form. The mastery of the Neapolitan sculptor lies in his successful depiction, looking through the veil, of the suffering that Christ had undergone during the crucifixion. Signs of Jesus's pain can be seen on his face and body.

Shaping further detail into the marble block, at Jesus's feet Sanmartino has carved depictions of the instruments of the passion: pliers, shackles, and the crown of thorns.

Legend of the veil 

Over the centuries, the masterly depiction of the veil has acquired a legend, in which the original commissioner of the sculpture, the famous scientist and alchemist Raimondo di Sangro, teaches the sculptor how to transform cloth into crystalline marble. Over the years many visitors to the Cappella, amazed by the veiled sculpture, erroneously believed it to be the result of an alchemical "marblification" performed by the prince. He was said to have laid a real veil on the sculpture, and to have transformed this veil into marble, over time, by means of a chemical process.

In reality, a close analysis leaves no doubt that the work was entirely produced in marble. This is also confirmed by some letters written at the time of its production. A receipt of payment to Sanmartino, dated 16 December 1752 and signed by the prince, is preserved in the Historical archive of the Bank of Naples and states:

In other letters, di Sangro also states that the veil was produced from the same block of stone as the statue.

See also 
 List of statues of Jesus
 Vestal Virgin Tuccia, 1743 sculpture
 Modesty, 1752 sculpture
 Veiled Vestal 1847 sculpture
 The Veiled Virgin, mid-19th century sculpture
 The Veiled Nun, c. 1863 sculpture
 Veiled Rebecca, 1863 sculpture

References

Bibliography 
 Marco Bussagli, Sansevero Chapel and the Veiled Christ in Naples, Bologna, Scripta Maneant, 2019, 
 Elio Catello, Giuseppe Sanmartino (1720-1793), Napoli, Electa, 2004.

External links 
 
 Official website of the Museum of the Cappella Sansevero

Baroque sculptures
Marble sculptures in Italy
Statues of Jesus
Cappella Sansevero
Christian art about death
Sculptures depicting the Entombment of Christ
Veiled statues